Lee Sterrey (born 1 May 1961) is an Australian soccer coach and former player who last coached Macarthur Rams in his home country in 2016. He has managed in the Australian National Soccer League (NSL) and Fiji.

Playing career
Sterrey played 87 times in the National Soccer League (NSL), turning out for Sydney Croatia in their first NSL season in 1984. In 1985, Sterrey moved to Marconi on a  transfer. He played two seasons for the Stallions, making 44 appearances. Sterrey returned to the NSL in 1989 playing for Blacktown City.

Coaching career
Taking charge of the Fiji national selection in 2004 on a two-year contract with the aim of improving the team and securing an A-League job, Sterrey has stated that Fijian football has gone in a downwards trajectory, disliking the use of foreign players and advising the use of young, homegrown talents instead. His first win as coach would be a 1–0 victory over India on 17 August 2005. By 2006, the Australian was replaced by Uruguayan Juan Carlos Buzzetti which would be his only coaching appointment abroad.

Achievements
 National Soccer League Championship Grand Final: 2002–03

References

External links
 Lee Sterrey revved up for return trip to Hunter
 Sterrey's star in the making 
 theworldgame.sbs.com.au tag
 

1961 births
Living people
Australian soccer players
Australian soccer coaches
Association football defenders
Sydney United 58 FC players
Marconi Stallions FC players
Blacktown City FC players
National Soccer League (Australia) players
Newcastle Jets FC managers
Marconi Stallions FC managers
Sydney Olympic FC managers
Fiji national football team managers
Parramatta FC managers
Australian expatriate soccer coaches
Expatriate football managers in Fiji
Australian expatriate sportspeople in Fiji
Newcastle Breakers FC players